The Aston Martin Virage is an automobile produced by British luxury automobile manufacturer Aston Martin as a replacement for its V8 models. Introduced at the Birmingham Motor Show in 1988, it was joined by the high-performance Vantage in 1993, and then the name of the base model was changed to V8 Coupe in 1996.

The V8-powered model was intended as the company's flagship model, with the 6-cylinder DB7, introduced in 1994, positioned below it as an entry-level model. Although the DB7 became available with a V12 engine and claimed a performance advantage, the Virage remained the exclusive, expensive and hand-built flagship of the Aston Martin range. It was replaced in 2000 with the Vanquish. By the end of the 2000 model year, 1,050 cars in total had been produced. The V8 Vantage name reappeared on a new entry-level model in 2005.

A new Virage model was introduced at the 2011 Geneva Motor Show, to fit into the middle of Aston Martin's then current lineup but was discontinued in 2012 due to many similarities between the brand's other models.



Virage/V8 Coupe and Works Service models

When compared to the preceding V8, the design was fresh and more modern. The Virage was more similar in design language to the Lagonda than the V8 it replaced. Indeed, the chassis was an evolution of the Lagonda's, with a de Dion tube rear suspension, located by triangulated radius rods and a Watts linkage, and a double wishbone unit at the front. To cut costs, many of the less-important pieces came from other companies, as had been the case for Aston Martin automobiles of the past. The sleek headlights and taillights were sourced from the Audi 200 and the Volkswagen Scirocco respectively, while General Motors, Jaguar, Citroën and  Ford provided the steering column, climate control panel, wing mirrors and dash switches. In fact, Ford had purchased Aston Martin and Jaguar shortly before the Virage debuted and it became the first model to be introduced under the new ownership.

The Virage was a large, heavy car in spite of its all-aluminium body, but the 32-valve 5.3 L (5,340 cc) V8 engine's  torque elevated its performance to near sports car levels. "Acceleration just never seems to run out", claimed Sports Car International during a first test. They also praised the "eager and quicker revving" nature of the  engine with its Callaway-designed heads and Weber-Marelli fuel injection. "Nothing sounds quite like an Aston V8," they concluded. English actor Rowan Atkinson owned Virage Coupé chassis 50010 which featured on the front cover of Car May 1990. In the article he commented how the modern climate control system provided heating efficiency beyond the veteran Aston Martin driver's dreams and could not believe warm air would emanate from the footwell within 90 seconds of start up. This car also appeared in the beginning of his 1991 TV series The Driven Man. Other celebrity owners included Lennox Lewis and Chris Eubank . 

The five-speed ZF Friedrichshafen manual was fitted to about forty percent of the cars produced. The more popular automatic option was the Chrysler three-speed Torqueflite transmission. For the 1993 model year, the three-speed unit was replaced by a four-speed automatic unit. The six-speed manual from the Vantage also became optional at the end of the Virage's production run.

Works Service

In January 1992, Aston Martin introduced a conversion service, upgrading the car into a Virage 6.3. As the name implies, the centerpiece of the conversion was a bored and stroked  V8 derived from the AMR1 racing car.

Other changes included 362 mm (14 in) ventilated disc brakes, the largest used in a passenger car until the Bentley Continental GT, and 18 in (457 mm) wheels. Visually, the 6.3 had wide flared bumpers, low sills and air dams, and side air vents.

Virage Shooting Brake
A shooting brake (estate) version of the Virage was offered in limited numbers. It debuted at the March 1992 Geneva Motor Show. Unlike prior Aston Martin Shooting Brake models, however, the Virage was produced in-house by the company's Works Service, with six believed to be constructed in total. The cars are believed to have retained Virage chassis numbers, except two that received chassis numbers of the type "DP/2099".

Lagonda Virage Saloon

The Lagonda Saloon is a long-wheelbase four-door Virage model that was built in very limited numbers to customer orders, reviving Aston Martin's long-dormant second marque. Introduced in 1994, it was manufactured by Aston Martin Works Service with a  chassis extension, although two were ordered with an  extension. The name refers to the four-door Aston Martin Lagonda. Six of these cars were ordered by a royal family.

Lagonda Virage Shooting Brake
The five-door Lagonda Virage Shooting Brake debuted at the same time as the Lagonda Virage. It was made by Aston Martin Works Service in only one or two examples, and has been spotted bearing "Vacances" badging at the rear. A further six cars were made for a royal family from the ground up, adding a  extension to the chassis of a standard Virage.

V8 Coupe
A less extreme V8 Coupe replaced the standard Virage from 1996 onwards having the updated styling inherited from the more powerful Vantage. In total, 101 examples of the V8 Coupe were built from 1996 through 2000.

V8 Sportsman Estate
The V8 was also subject to coachbuilt conversion by Aston Martin's Works Service department. Dubbed the Sportsman estate, only three were made using existing V8 Coupes as a base. No mechanical modifications were made and the Estate retained the V8 Coupe's engine and mechanicals.

Virage Volante/V8 Volante

The convertible version of the Virage, called the Virage Volante debuted at the 1990 Birmingham Motor Show as a strict two-seater, but a 2+2 version was shown at the 1991 Geneva Motor Show. Production examples, first appearing in 1992, were all to feature 2+2 seating. Sources state that either 224 or 233 examples had been produced when production ended in 1996.

1992 was also when Aston Martin introduced its 6.3-litre "Works Service" package, which included wider fenders to accommodate the larger OZ wheels and 14-inch disc brakes, additional vents, deeper sills, and other appearance modifications. This was immediately available on the Coupé as well as the Volante. Aston Martin soon introduced a strictly cosmetic version called the Wide Body featuring the regular 5.3-litre engine; this was mainly intended for the United States market as the 6.3 was not certified for sale there. 13 of these were built for the United States, whereas only seven regular Virage Volantes were delivered there. In contrast to the Wide Body Volante, the Prince of Wales chose to equip his 1994 Volante with the standard bodywork coupled with the  6.3-litre engine and a manual transmission.

Only 63 units were built by the time production came to a halt.

Vantage

As with many other Aston Martin models, a high-performance Vantage model of the Virage would later be introduced. First shown at Birmingham in September 1992, the Vantage was produced from 1993 through 2000 and, like many other Aston Vantage models would soon become the only variant available. The Virage name lasted just a few years, with its final descendants inheriting the simple and familiar V8 name.

The Vantage had new styling with only the roof, doors and wing mirrors shared with the Virage. The wing mirrors were later replaced in favour of the ones from the Jaguar XK8/XKR. The Vantage is wider, lower, used four round tail lights (later adopted for the base V8 Coupe), and featured new rear suspension and interior electronics. Like the 6.3, the Vantage used record-sized 362 mm (14 in) brake discs and 18 inch wheels.

The biggest change to the Vantage was inside the engine compartment. The  V8 engine now used twin superchargers. Power output was now , and the torque was equally high at 555 lb·ft (745 N·m) at 4,000 rpm.

In 2000, Aston Martin's Works Service unit also built nine bespoke Vantage Volante models (convertibles), one of which was built to long wheelbase specifications.

V8 Vantage Le Mans

The new European emission and safety regulations made Aston Martin decide to end production of the V8-Vantage line and the final model was called "V8 Vantage Le Mans". Honoring Aston Martin's 1959 victory at the 24 Hours of Le Mans, the prototype of a limited run of 40 was presented in Geneva in 1999 on the 40th anniversary of the win.

The bodywork featured a blanked-out front grille and modified side vents – replicating the side vents of the Le Mans winning DBR-1 – as well as a bigger front spoiler and rear skirt. The interior was reworked with a large rev-counter, a special Titanium finish on some parts, and features such as heated windshield, parking radars, traction control, heated electric seats, and full Connolly leather upholstery with matching Wilton wool carpets. Wheels were the same Dymag magnesium units as seen on most V600s. The keyholder was in sterling silver and a map from Newport-Pagnell to the legendary Le Mans track was provided in the delivery documents. Each car was made upon special commission and fitted with a number plate indicating also the name of the first owner.

U.S. availability
The Virage would not become available in the United States until the summer of 1990 and the Virage Volante convertible became available later in 1992. Coupé versions and the Virage Vantage were not officially offered for sale in the U.S. The car's availability ended after the 1993 model year, due to the lack of passenger airbags and inability to meet emissions regulations.

Virage (2011–2012)

A new generation of the Virage was introduced at the 2011 Geneva Motor Show by Aston Martin. The Virage capitalised on the technology from the DBS and united it with the comfort and refinement found in the DB9 and Rapide. The Virage was intended to sit in the narrow slot between the basic DB9 and the flagship DBS. Aston Martin announced that the second generation of the Virage would be discontinued after 18 months of production, as the distinctions between it, the DB9, and the DBS were simply too slim. With only 1001 Aston Martin Virage produced, UK deliveries were 114 (right-hand drive) of which 22 were Coupés and 92 Volantes.

The car has a 2-seat or 2+2 seating configuration. The Virage was available in two bodystyles: Coupé or Volante (convertible).

2014 Aston Martin Virage Shooting Brake Zagato Centennial 
In September 2014, Zagato revealed a one-off shooting brake at the Chantilly Arts & Elegance Concours d’Elegance. The car is based on the Aston Martin Virage. It was commissioned by a European client. It follows the same design cues as the Aston Martin DBS Coupe Zagato Centennial and Aston Martin DB9 Spyder Zagato Centennial.

References

1. 
2. Covello, Mike, updated by, Standard Catalog of Imported Cars: 1946–2002, Krause Publications, Iola, WI, U.S.A., 2002.

External links
 

Virage
Cars introduced in 1989
1990s cars
Coupés
Grand tourers
Cars introduced in 2011
Cars discontinued in 2012